The Griswold Hills are a low mountain range in the Southern Inner California Coast Ranges System, in southeastern San Benito County, central California.

They are east of the Diablo Range, on the west side of the San Joaquin Valley.  They define the southern Panoche Valley.

The Bureau of Land Management operates the Griswold Hills Day Use Area.

References

External links 
 Griswold Hills Day Use Area

Mountain ranges of San Benito County, California
California Coast Ranges
Geography of the San Joaquin Valley